The Shangri-Las were an American pop girl group of the 1960s. Between 1964 and 1966 several hit songs of theirs documented teen tragedies and melodramas. They continue to be known for their hits "Remember (Walking in the Sand)", "Give Him a Great Big Kiss", and in particular, "Leader of the Pack" which went to #1 in the US in late 1964.

Early career
The group was formed at Andrew Jackson High School in Cambria Heights, a neighborhood in Queens, New York City, in 1963. The group was two pairs of sisters: Mary Weiss (lead singer) (born December 28, 1948) and Elizabeth "Betty" Weiss (born November 27, 1946), and identical twins Marguerite "Marge"/"Margie" Ganser (February 4, 1948 – July 28, 1996) and Mary Ann Ganser (February 4, 1948 – March 14, 1970).

They began playing school shows, talent shows, and teen hops; Artie Ripp heard about them and arranged the group's first record deal with Kama Sutra. Their first recording in December 1963 was "Simon Says", later issued on the Smash label, on which Betty Weiss sang lead. They also recorded "Wishing Well" / "Hate to Say I Told You So", which became their first release in early 1964 when leased to the small Spokane, Washington label.

Initially the girls performed without a name for their group; however when they signed their first deal, they began calling themselves the Shangri-Las, after a restaurant in Queens.

Some discographies list The Beatle-ettes and The Bon Bons, who both issued singles in 1964, as early versions of the Shangri-Las; however, they are different groups.

Mary Weiss was the main lead singer; Betty, however, took lead on "Maybe" (the LP version), "Shout", "Twist and Shout", "Wishing Well", and a number of B-sides and album tracks. Mary Ann Ganser took lead on most of "I'm Blue", which is a cover of the Ikettes' biggest hit at the time, and was included on their 1965 album Shangri-Las 65!.

Success at Red Bird Records
In April 1964, while the girls were minors their parents signed with Red Bird Records; Mary was 15, Betty was 17, and the Ganser twins were 16. Having been hired by record producer George "Shadow" Morton, they had their first success with the summer hit "Remember (Walking in the Sand)" (U.S. #5, UK #14). Billy Joel, a then-unknown working as a session musician, played on the demo of "Remember (Walkin' in the Sand)". The demo was nearly seven minutes long, too long for Top 40 radio. Morton had hired the group to perform on the demo, but Red Bird released a re-recorded version. Morton faded the new version out around 2:16.

The recordings for Morton featured lavish production with heavy orchestration and sound effects, and their next and biggest hit, "Leader of the Pack" (U.S. #1, UK #11), climaxes with roaring motorcycles and breaking glass. UK re-issues peaked at #3 in 1972 and #7 in 1976.  The song epitomized the "death disc"; other examples include Ray Peterson's "Tell Laura I Love Her", Jan and Dean's "Dead Man's Curve", J. Frank Wilson and the Cavaliers's "Last Kiss," Mark Dinning's "Teen Angel", Dickey Lee's "Laurie (Strange Things Happen"), Twinkle's "Terry", and Jody Reynolds' "Endless Sleep".

After the sudden success of "Remember (Walking in the Sand)", all the girls were called upon to make personal appearances, which required them to leave high school. Mary, however, stayed on for classes at a high school for young professionals in Manhattan.

By the end of 1964, the group was an established act. They performed with the Beatles, a Fall 1964 tour with the Rolling Stones, R&B artists such as The Drifters and James Brown (who according to Mary Weiss was surprised to discover the girls were white), and Cashbox magazine listed them as best new R&B group. The group was also a fixture on the Murray the K shows at the Brooklyn Fox from 1964 to 1966. They also promoted Revlon cosmetics. In March 1965, they toured the United Kingdom with Wayne Fontana and the Mindbenders, Herman's Hermits, Del Shannon, and others.

The Shangri-Las appeared as a quartet to promote "Remember", starting with their stint on the 1964 Labor Day Murray the K show in September. Shortly before the Shangri-Las went to the UK for the aforementioned promotional tour in Oct. 1964, Betty Weiss dropped out temporarily, leaving the group as a trio. She is still featured on the recording for "Leader of the Pack", which was recorded prior to the release of "Remember". The trio which remained went on to tour the US and also appeared on many TV shows, including Hullabaloo, Shindig!, Hollywood A-Go-Go, and Lloyd Thaxton. Many TV clips and photos of the group taken at this time (just Mary Weiss and the twins) circulated at the group's peak in popularity and beyond, which led many to recall the group being only a trio. Betty then rejoined the group in mid-1965 (her first return appearance with the Shangri-las was listed as a June 1965 Hollywood A-Go-Go Show episode hosted by Cousin Brucie in New York City), and the group appeared as a quartet once again until the start of 1966, when they permanently became a trio again (Mary Ann and Marge left at different times, replacing each other until the demise of the group).

The group alternated between touring with their own band and local bands. Among the latter were the Sonics, as well as the Iguanas featuring a young Iggy Pop. They also appeared as headliners on package tours such as Dick Clark's Caravan of Stars, and as said tours with R&B acts like the Orlons and Joe Tex. Later in their career, the Shangri-Las performed several college dates with bands like The Young Rascals, The Animals, and Vanilla Fudge.

Public image
The Shangri-Las' "tough girl" persona set them apart from other girl groups. Having grown up in a rough neighborhood of Queens, New York, they were less demure than their contemporaries. Rumors about supposed escapades have since become legend; for example, the story that Mary Weiss attracted the attention of the FBI for transporting a firearm across state lines. In her defense, she said someone tried to break into her hotel room one night and for protection she bought a pistol. Whatever truth the stories may have, they were believed by fans in the 1960s, and they helped cement the group's bad-girl reputation. According to Weiss, that persona helped fend off advances from musicians on tours.

The Shangri-Las continued to chart with fairly successful U.S. hit records, specializing in adolescent themes such as alienation, loneliness, abandonment, and premature death. Singles included "Give Him a Great Big Kiss", "Out in the Streets", "Give Us Your Blessings", the top ten hit "I Can Never Go Home Anymore", "Long Live Our Love" (a rare example of a song dedicated to the men at the time fighting overseas in Vietnam), "He Cried" and the spoken-word "Past, Present, and Future", featuring a musical backdrop inspired by Beethoven's "Moonlight Sonata". Noteworthy B-sides included "Heaven Only Knows", "The Train from Kansas City", "Dressed in Black" and "Paradise" (written by Harry Nilsson).

Among titles in favorites lists is "I Can Never Go Home Anymore", the story of a girl who leaves home for a boy; her pride keeps her from returning to her mother who "grew so lonely in the end/the angels picked her for their friend". Lines from "Give Him a Great Big Kiss" include "When I say I'm in love, you best believe I'm in love, L-U-V", and "Well I hear he's bad." "Hmm, he's good-bad, but he's not evil." "Past, Present, and Future" has been said to be about rape, something Weiss disagrees with. She has said it is about "teenage angst," heartbreak, and "being hurt and angsty and not wanting anyone near you."

Disintegration and retirement
The group appeared on several TV shows and continued to tour the US, but in 1966, two of three releases on Red Bird failed to crack the U.S. top 50, though the group remained popular in England and Japan. Mary Ann Ganser left, but returned early in 1967 when Marge–the most outspoken member, sometimes considered the leader – left. Red Bird Records had folded. The group recorded more tracks with Shadow Morton producing (some of which remain unreleased) and signed with Mercury Records. However, Morton had begun working with Janis Ian and Vanilla Fudge, and Mercury had little enthusiasm for the group. During their Mercury stint, the Shangri-Las had no further hits; in 1968, they disbanded, amid litigation.

All the Shangri-Las withdrew from the spotlight. Morton said, "The Shangri-Las vacated, they vanished". Reportedly they were angry that they had received few royalties despite the millions of records they had sold.

Mary Weiss moved to New York's Greenwich Village and then to San Francisco. Returning to Manhattan a few years later and prevented from recording because of lawsuits, she worked as a secretary while taking college classes. She then went into the architectural industry, working in the accounting department of a New York architectural firm. Weiss moved up to be the chief purchasing agent and later ran the commercial furniture dealership. In the late eighties, she managed a furniture store and was an interior designer. By 2001, she was a furniture consultant to New York businesses. 
She married in 1974, but the marriage ended in 1988; she married again several years later, and her second husband now manages her music career.

Betty Weiss had a daughter in 1964, necessitating her absence from the group during this period. She was the only member of the group to have a child (who was raised with the help of Betty's brother George Weiss, who died in 1998). Betty Weiss also married and held several jobs and now lives and works on Long Island.

Mary Ann Ganser began having problems with drug and alcohol addiction in 1968. She died in Queens on March 15, 1970, aged 22, of a drug overdose. (This may have been a heroin overdose as mentioned in a contemporary newspaper report and on her death certificate, or a barbiturate overdose as related later by her mother to a journalist)  Her death has been incorrectly reported as having been caused by encephalitis, or by a seizure disorder.

Marge Ganser reportedly returned to school in the late 1960s. By the early 1970s, she married (changing her name to Marguerite Ganser Dorste), worked for NYNEX in Valley Stream, New York, and died of breast cancer on July 28, 1996, at age 48.

The group declined offers to perform throughout the 1970s, although they did have a few live performances. Following the successful re-issue of "Leader of the Pack" in the UK in 1976, which renewed interest in the group, Mary and Betty Weiss and Marge Ganser reunited. Contacting Seymour Stein of Sire Records, they spent summer 1977 in New York with producer Andy Paley. Paley said the sessions went well, but they weren't satisfied with all the material, and declined to release the record. The tapes are now owned by the Warner Music Group. They did, however, give a live performance at CBGB; Paley put together a band, including Lenny Kaye, and after two hours of rehearsal, the Shangri-Las returned to the stage for the first time in a decade. Although the Sire sessions came to naught, the group toyed with signing to another label; however, they were put off by the insistence of record executives that they be a disco vocal group, the musical trend of the day. Mary said she envisioned the Shangri-Las like punk singer Patti Smith. Eventually, the Shangri-Las split up again.

Since the 1980s, a trio has been performing under the name the Shangri-Las, although unconnected with the original group. The copycat act was put together by Dick Fox, who claimed to have bought the rights to the name, and resulted in legal action from both sides, largely due to a video tape of the new Shangri-Las claiming in public to be the original group.  The original group performed for the last time at a reunion show hosted by Cousin Brucie (Bruce Morrow) in East Rutherford, New Jersey on June 3, 1989.

In March 2007, Norton Records released a solo album by Mary Weiss (backed by garage rockers The Reigning Sound) titled Dangerous Game. She performed in the United States, Spain, and France.

Influence
The streetwise image of the Shangri-Las – initially a promotional device for "Leader of the Pack" – contrasted with other "girl groups" of the 1960s, and they were cited as an influence by 1970s punk rock-era acts such as the New York Dolls and Blondie; the latter covered "Out in the Streets" twice. The Go-Go's have been performing "Remember (Walking in the Sand)" live ever since their early punk rock days in Los Angeles clubs.

The opening line from "Give Him a Great Big Kiss" – "When I say I'm in love, you best believe I'm in love, L-U-V" – was used by the New York Dolls on their 1973 recording "Looking for a Kiss". It is also used by the English pop trio SOHO in the beginning of their song "Nuthin' on My Mind" from their album, Goddess. The New York Dolls' guitarist Johnny Thunders included a cover of "...Great Big Kiss" on his first solo album So Alone. Ian Svenonius also used the line at the beginning of "Today I Met the Girl I'm Going to Marry" by his band Nation of Ulysses on the album 13-Point Program to Destroy America. More recently, Ryan Adams (and the Cardinals) paid homage to that line in their song "Beautiful Sorta" off the album Cold Roses, but they changed it to "When I say L-U-V, you better believe me L-U-V. Give me a beer!" In 2005, Julian Cope parodied the famous line in "Dying to Meet You" from his album Citizen Cain'd. He's heard to say "When I say I'm dead, you best believe I'm dead, D-E-A-D" during the outro. In an outtake of "Careless" from their album Sorry Ma, Forgot to Take Out the Trash, The Replacements opened with the line "When I say I'm in debt, you best believe I'm in debt, D-E-T!"

In 1972, "Leader of the Pack" was performed by Bette Midler on her debut album The Divine Miss M. The opening from "Leader of the Pack" – "Is she really going out with him?" – was recycled both as the opening lines of 1976's "New Rose" by the Damned, the first British punk rock single, and of "Kill" by the parody punk group Alberto Y Lost Trios Paranoias, as well as the title of the 1979 hit song by Joe Jackson.

Aerosmith released a more rock-style version of "Remember (Walking in the Sand)" featuring uncredited backing vocals by Mary Weiss of the Shangri-Las as a single in 1980. It can be found on both their Greatest Hits album and on their Night in the Ruts album, and charted on the Hot 100 at 67.

Scottish alternative rock band The Jesus and Mary Chain cited the Shangri-Las as an early influence. In 1985, the band's guitarist William Reid stated: "We all love the Shangri-Las, and one day we're going to make Shangri-Las records."

The Shangri-Las are referenced in John Mellencamp's 1985 single "R.O.C.K. in the U.S.A." from his third album Scarecrow. They were also referenced by Paul McCartney in a McCartney II sessions track, "Mr H Atom" / "You Know I'll Get You Baby", recorded in 1979, but not released until 2011.

Twisted Sister covered "Leader of the Pack" on their 1985 gold-selling album Come Out and Play.

"Past, Present, and Future" was covered in 2004 by ex-ABBA singer Agnetha Fältskog on her album, My Colouring Book.

The Johnny Thunders / Patti Palladin album Copy Cats (1988) features a version of "He Cried".

Australian artist Rowland S. Howard included a version of "She Cried" on his album Teenage Snuff Film (1999).

Although most covers and remakes of the Shangri-Las material focus on the hit singles, some express the group's influence on them by recording songs from the Shangri-Las which were never released as singles by the group. Among these, the Los Angeles rock group Redd Kross covered "Heaven Only Knows," an album cut from the Shangri-Las' second album Shangri-Las '65. Superchunk, Belle and Sebastian, The Shop Assistants and Neko Case recorded versions of "The Train from Kansas City", which was a b-side, and an album cut from the Shangri-Las debut album, Leader of the Pack.

British singer Amy Winehouse cited the Shangri-Las as an influence and occasionally integrated the hook lyrics from "Remember (Walking in the Sand)" into the bridge of her song "Back to Black" during live performances.  Winehouse has called "I Can Never Go Home Anymore" the "saddest song in the world."

Faris Badwan of The Horrors has listed the Shangri-Las as an influence in The Horrors' sound and lyrics, and had added a reworked version of "He Cried" to "She Cried" into The Horrors' song, "Who Can Say," using the lines, "And when I told her I didn’t love her anymore, she cried/and when I told her, her kisses were not like before, she cried/and when I told her another girl had caught my eye, she cried/and I kissed her, with a kiss that could only mean goodbye," in spoken-word with a drum beat similar to that the Shangri-Las used. The song is also originally "She Cried" by Jay and the Americans, another (if slight) influence over The Horrors.

Black Lips, an Atlanta band, called their 2007 album Good Bad Not Evil, after the line in "Give Him a Great Big Kiss".

Sonic Youth referenced the "very, very close" lyric of "Give Him a Great Big Kiss" on the Kim Gordon/Kim Deal duet "Little Trouble Girl" in 1995. Early punk band The Slits also reference the song in "Love Und Romance" on the 1979 album Cut.

The Bat for Lashes song "What's a Girl to Do?" has been widely acknowledged as a Shangri-Las pastiche.

Kathleen Hanna of the electropunk group Le Tigre has mentioned that the "one girl calling another" motif and the opening sound of seagulls on the track "What's Yr Take on Cassavetes?" were inspired by the Shangri-Las.

The Shangri-Las were imitated by groups like The Nu-Luvs, who had a hit with "So Soft, So Warm", which was originally recorded by the Shangri-Las as "Dressed In Black" and used as the b-side to Jay and the Americans' original, "He Cried". Others included the Pussycats and the Whyte Boots, who scored big with their single "Nightmare", originally intended for the Shangri-Las, and written, produced and performed by Lori Burton and Pam Sawyer. The Goodees had a hit in early 1969 with "Condition Red", a "Leader of the Pack"-inspired tale about a girl who wants to be with her long-haired, bearded boyfriend despite her parents' objections.

The Detergents had hits with "Leader of the Laundromat" and "I Can Never Eat Home Any More", both of which were parodies of Shangri-Las records.

Giddle Partridge and Boyd Rice recorded a cover of "Past, Present, and Future" in 1989. Alex Chilton often played it in concert.

Brooklyn band Vivian Girls cite the Shangri-Las as one of their influences.

Finnish rock band HIM used "Dressed in Black" as an intro song for their tour promoting their album Screamworks: Love in Theory and Practice.

Marianne Faithfull released a cover of "Past, Present, and Future" on her 2011 album Horses and High Heels.

The bridge of "Remember (Walking in the Sand)" and the background vocals of "Leader of the Pack" are heavily sampled in the track "No" from the 2012 album Dusty Rainbow from the Dark by French hip hop artist Wax Tailor.

While recording her 2017 album Lust for Life, American singer Lana Del Rey was heavily influenced by The Shangri-Las.

In the 2015 documentary Wider Horizons, David Gilmour, guitarist for Pink Floyd, cited the Shangri-Las as an influence, saying their music "painted aural pictures".

In the eighth episode of [[RuPaul's Drag Race (season 14)|RuPaul's Drag Race'''s 14th season]], drag queens Bosco, Daya Betty, and Willow Pill performed an original song "Bad Boy Baby" as "The Shangru-Las", both parodying and paying homage to the music and style of The Shangri-Las.

In TV Girl's 2016 album "Who Really Cares", the song "For You" starts with a sample of their Good Taste Tips

Discography
Timeline

Studio albums

Compilation albums
1966: Golden Hits of the Shangri-Las1975: The Shangri-Las Sing1986: The Dixie Cups Meet the Shangri-Las1994: Myrmidons of Melodrama1996: The Best of the Shangri-Las2002: Myrmidons of Melodrama (Re-issue)
2008: Remembered2008: Greatest Hits2009: The Complete CollectionSingles

Lead vocalist, per song

(Lead vocals were often double-tracked: The vocalist recorded her part and then overdubbed that part herself, singing the same notes and words, in order to "thicken" the sound)

"Simon Says"—Betty
"Wishing Well"—Betty
"Hate to Say I Told You So"—Betty
"Remember (Walking in the Sand)"—Mary
"It's Easier to Cry"—Betty
"Leader of the Pack"—Mary and Betty in tandem (i.e., singing the same notes and words), with Mary mixed slightly louder
"What Is Love?"—Betty
"Give Him a Great Big Kiss"—Mary
"Maybe"—Betty (The overall song was slowed down during the mastering stage, in order to extend the length)
"Shout"—Betty (in spite of Mary later lip-synching the song on the Lloyd Thaxton show in February, 1965 due to Betty's absence)
"Out in the Streets"—Mary
"The Boy"—Betty
"Give Us Your Blessings"—Mary
"Heaven Only Knows"—Mary (The overall song was slowed down during the mastering stage, in order to extend the length)
"Never Again"—Mary (with Betty singing the prominent "baby" twice near the end)
"I'm Blue"—Mary Ann
"Right Now and Not Later"—Mary
"The Train From Kansas City"—Mary
"I Can Never Go Home Anymore"—Mary
"Bull Dog"—Betty
"Sophisticated Boom Boom"—Betty (with Mary Ann singing the ad-libbed "yeahs" during the second chorus)
"Long Live Our Love"—Mary
"He Cried"—Mary
"Dressed in Black"—Betty
"Past, Present, and Future"—Mary
"Paradise"—Mary
"Love You More Than Yesterday"—Mary
"The Sweet Sounds of Summer"—Mary
"I'll Never Learn"—Mary
"Take the Time"—Mary (with Mary Ann singing the prominent "yeah" at the end of each chorus)
"Footsteps on the Roof"—Mary

Notes

References
"Shangri-Las 77!", footnote 4, by Phil X Milstein, Spectropop

External links
MacKinney, L. (2012). "Dressed in black": the Shangri-Las and their recorded legacy. Doctoral Thesis by Lisa MacKinney
 Fan website
Out In The Streets, The Story of The Shangri-Las, an extensive article by John J. Grecco
 "Songs of The Stonewall Club" featuring Mary Weiss & The Shangri-Las
Article by David Galassie
August 2008 Interview with L.A. Record
Biographic details for Marge Ganser in findagrave.com
Norton Records' extensive 2007 interview with Mary Weiss
A unique footage showing the Shangri-Las and The Playmate Blues Band leaving an hotel during a tour, year 1966. From the public Facebook page of The Playmate Blues Band

Listening
 Interview with Mary Weiss from Fresh Air'' radio program, NPR Podcast, March 6, 2007
 Interview with Mary Weiss from WFMU-FM, Real Audio archive, October 9, 2007

Mercury Records artists
Smash Records artists
Sibling musical groups
American pop music groups
American pop girl groups
Musical groups established in 1963
Musical groups disestablished in 1968
Female-fronted musical groups
Musical groups from Queens, New York